Basie may refer to:

 Azraq, Jordan, known as Basie or Basienis by the Romans
 William James "Count" Basie (1904–1984), American jazz musician
 Basie, the bandleader's 1954 album on the Clef label
 Basie, the bandleader's 1958 album on the Roulette label, later re-released as The Atomic Mr. Basie